"Mr. Spielberg" is a German-language song performed by Austrian singer-songwriter and radio presenter Julian Le Play. The song was released as a digital download on 20 April 2012. The song reached number 29 on the Austrian Singles Chart. The song is included on his debut studio album Soweit Sonar (2012).

Music video
A music video to accompany the release of "Mr. Spielberg" was first released onto YouTube on 23 April 2012 at a total length of six minutes and fifty-five seconds.

Track listing

Chart performance

Release history

References

2012 songs
2012 singles
Julian Le Play songs